The following highways are numbered 50:

International
 European route E50

Brazil
 BR-050

Canada
 Alberta Highway 50
 Manitoba Highway 50
 Newfoundland and Labrador Route 50
 Ontario Highway 50 (Also referred to as  Peel Regional Road 50 and  York Regional Road 24)
 Quebec Autoroute 50

China 
  G50 Expressway

Czech Republic
 I/50 Highway; Czech: Silnice I/50

Finland
 Ring III (Kt 50)

India
 , a National Highway between Pune and Nashik cities

Ireland
 M50 motorway (Ireland)

Israel
 Begin Expressway Highway 50 (Israel). A freeway in Jerusalem, Israel.

Italy
 Autostrada A50

Japan
 Japan National Route 50

Jordan

Korea, South
 Yeongdong Expressway
 National Route 50

Malaysia
  Malaysia Federal Route 50

New Zealand
 New Zealand State Highway 50

Poland 
  DK50, a national road functioning as a transit ring road around Warsaw
  motorway A50, planned motorway being a part of new ring road around Warsaw
  expressway S50, planned expressway being a part of new ring road around Warsaw

Turkey
  , a motorway in Turkey as the half ring road in Adana.

United Kingdom
 British A50 (Leicester-Warrington)
 British M50 (Strensham-Ross on Wye)

United States
 Interstate 50 (North Carolina–Virginia) (former proposal)
 U.S. Route 50
 U.S. Route 50N (Kansas) (former)
 U.S. Route 50N (Ohio–West Virginia) (former)
 U.S. Route 50S (Kansas) (former)
 U.S. Route 50S (Ohio–West Virginia) (former)
 Alabama State Route 50
 Arizona State Route 50 (never built)
 Arkansas Highway 50
Colorado State Highway 50 (1923-1968) (former)
 Florida State Road 50
 Florida State Road 50A
 Georgia State Route 50
 Georgia State Route 50N (former)
 Georgia State Route 50S (former)
 Hawaii Route 50
 Idaho State Highway 50
 Illinois Route 50
 Iowa Highway 50 (former)
 Kentucky Route 50 (former)
 Louisiana Highway 50
 Louisiana State Route 50 (former)
 M-50 (Michigan highway)
 Minnesota State Highway 50
 County Road 50 (Dakota County, Minnesota)
 County Road 50 (Ramsey County, Minnesota)
 Mississippi Highway 50
Missouri Route 50 (1922) (former)
Montana Highway 50 (former)
 Nebraska Highway 50
 Nebraska Link 50A
 Nebraska Recreation Road 50B
 Nebraska Recreation Road 50C
 Nevada State Route 50 (1935) (former)
 New Jersey Route 50
 County Route 50 (Bergen County, New Jersey)
 County Route 50 (Monmouth County, New Jersey)
 County Route 50 (Ocean County, New Jersey)
 New Mexico State Road 50
 New York State Route 50
 County Route 50 (Cattaraugus County, New York)
 County Route 50 (Cayuga County, New York)
 County Route 50 (Chautauqua County, New York)
 County Route 50 (Dutchess County, New York)
 County Route 50 (Erie County, New York)
 County Route 50 (Greene County, New York)
 County Route 50 (Monroe County, New York)
 County Route 50A (Oneida County, New York)
 County Route 50 (Onondaga County, New York)
 County Route 50 (Ontario County, New York)
 County Route 50 (Otsego County, New York)
 County Route 50 (Putnam County, New York)
 County Route 50 (Rensselaer County, New York)
 County Route 50 (Schoharie County, New York)
 County Route 50 (Suffolk County, New York)
 County Route 50A (Suffolk County, New York)
 County Route 50B (Suffolk County, New York)
 County Route 50C (Suffolk County, New York)
 County Route 50 (Ulster County, New York)
 North Carolina Highway 50
 North Dakota Highway 50
 Ohio State Route 50 (1923-1927) (former)
 Oklahoma State Highway 50
 Oklahoma State Highway 50A
 Oklahoma State Highway 50B
 Oregon Route 50 (former)
 Pennsylvania Route 50
 South Carolina Highway 50 (former, multiple)
 South Dakota Highway 50
 Tennessee State Route 50
 Texas State Highway 50
 Texas State Highway Loop 50 (former)
 Texas State Highway Spur 50 (former)
 Farm to Market Road 50
 Texas Park Road 50
 Utah State Route 50 (former, multiple)
 Virginia State Route 50 (former)
 Wisconsin Highway 50
 Wyoming Highway 50

See also 
 A50 roads

Highways